Heterodrilus rarus is a species of oligochaete worm, first found in Belize, on the Caribbean side of Central America.

References

Further reading
Diaz, Robert J., and Christer Erseus. "Habitat preferences and species associations of shallow-water marine Tubificidae (Oligochaeta) from the barrier reef ecosystems off Belize, Central America." Aquatic Oligochaete Biology V. Springer Netherlands, 1994. 93–105.
Sjölin, Erica. "Tubificids with trifid chaetae: morphology and phylogeny of Heterodrilus (Clitellata, Annelida)." (2007).

External links
WORMS

Naididae
Taxa named by Christer Erséus